Scribonius Largus (c. 1-c. 50) was the court physician to the Roman emperor Claudius.

About 47 AD, at the request of Gaius Julius Callistus, the emperor's freedman, he drew up a list of 271 prescriptions (Compositiones), most of them his own, although he acknowledged his indebtedness to his tutors, to friends, and to the writings of eminent physicians. Certain traditional remedies are also included. The work has no pretensions to style, and contains many colloquialisms. The greater part of it was transferred without acknowledgment to the work of Marcellus Empiricus (c. 410), De Medicamentis Empiricis, Physicis, et Rationabilibus, which is of great value for the correction of the text of Largus.

See the edition of the Compositiones by S. Sconocchia (Teubner 1983), which replaced the well-outdated edition of G. Helmreich (Teubner 1887).

Works
 De compositione medicamentorum liber. Cratandrus, Basileae 1529 Digital edition by the University and State Library Düsseldorf
 Kai Brodersen: Scribonius Largus, Der gute Arzt / Compositiones. Latin and German. Marix, Wiesbaden 2016. 
Scribonius Largus and Joelle Jouanna Bouchet (ed.) Compositions médicales (Collection des universités de France. Série latine; 412). Paris : Les Belles lettres, 2016, cop. 2016. .

References

James Grout: Scribonius Largus, part of the Encyclopædia Romana

Ancient Roman writers
Silver Age Latin writers
1st-century Roman physicians
1st-century writers
Scribonii
AD 1 births
50 deaths